Scarr Mountain  at , is the 174th–highest peak in Ireland on the Arderin scale, and the 207th–highest peak on the Vandeleur-Lynam scale.  Scarr is situated in the central sector of the Wicklow Mountains range, but off main "central spine" of the range that runs from Kippure in the north, to Lugnaquillia in the south.  Scarr lies on its own small massif that includes Scarr North-West Top  and Kanturk  ; it is bounded by Lough Dan to the east and the Glenmacnass Valley on the west. Scarr's sharp peak gives it a distinctive profile amongst the rounded summits of the Wicklow mountains, and it forms the backdrop to scenic views across the Guinness Estate and Lough Dan.

Hill walking
A popular trail is the  4-5 hour Scarr and Kanturk Loop walk, which starts at a lay-by outside Oldbridge at the southern end of Lough Dan.  The recommended route is counter-clockwise, summiting Kanturk first and then crossing to the summit of Scarr before returning to Oldbridge.

Gallery

See also

Wicklow Way
Wicklow Round
Wicklow Mountains
Lists of mountains in Ireland
List of mountains of the British Isles by height
List of Marilyns in the British Isles
List of Hewitt mountains in England, Wales and Ireland

References

Bibliography

External links
MountainViews: The Irish Mountain Website, Scarr
MountainViews: Irish Online Mountain Database
The Database of British and Irish Hills , the largest database of British Isles mountains ("DoBIH")
Hill Bagging UK & Ireland, the searchable interface for the DoBIH

Marilyns of Ireland
Mountains and hills of County Wicklow
Hewitts of Ireland
Mountains under 1000 metres